Boronia tolerans is a plant in the citrus family, Rutaceae and is endemic to a small area in the Northern Territory in Australia. It is an erect shrub with many branches, pinnate leaves and white, four-petalled flowers. It is only known from Nitmiluk National Park.

Description
There are eight stamens and the style is glabrous. Flowering occurs from March to June.

Taxonomy and naming
Boronia tolerans was first formally described in 1997 by Marco F. Duretto who published the description in the journal Nuytsia. The specific epithet (tolerans) is derived from Latin tolerans, meaning "tolerant", referring to "the great mental hardship suffered by Dr Greg Howell on the day this species was collected in the field."

Distribution and habitat
This boronia grows in woodland on the top of the plateau in the Nitmiluk National Park.

Conservation status
Boronia tolerans is classified as "near threatened" under the Territory Parks and Wildlife Conservation Act 2000 (TPWCA).

References

tolerans
Flora of the Northern Territory
Plants described in 1852
Taxa named by Nikolai Turczaninow